Hopea ponga is a species of plant in the family Dipterocarpaceae. It is endemic to India. It is also known as kambakam (കമ്പകം) in Malayalam language.

Gallery

References

External links

Biotik Project Species Profile

ponga
Flora of India (region)
Endangered plants
Taxonomy articles created by Polbot